The following is a listing of the documentation available for the former Wendover Air Force Base, Utah, through the public-domain Historic American Buildings Survey (HABS). 

Historic American Buildings Survey in Utah